High Finance is a 1933 British drama film directed by George King and starring Gibb McLaughlin and Ida Lupino, which was marketed as "the drama of a man overwhelmed by his own success".  It is now classed as a lost film. It was produced and distributed by Warner Brothers and shot at Teddington Studios as a quota quickie.

Plot
Self-made businessman Sir Grant Rayburn (McLaughlin) is obsessed with making money to the exclusion of all else.  He shows little interest in his daughter Jill (Lupino) and is irritated when she falls in love with, and wishes to marry, a young man named Tom (John Batten).  Sir Grant does not believe Tom is a suitable match for Jill as he does not come from a moneyed background.  He suspects that Tom is a chancer with an eye on access to Jill's money, and as she is still under age he refuses to give her consent to marry and considers the matter closed, with no concern for Jill's feelings.

Sir Grant discovers what he believes to be a quick and easy way to make a financial killing, and goes full steam ahead with the scheme in the face of concern from his advisers that it is risky in the extreme, and potentially illegal.  The scheme ends in disaster, with Sir Grant publicly exposed as a law-breaker and sentenced to a term of imprisonment.  While behind bars he has time to reflect on his mistakes, and realises that he has allowed greed and selfishness to control his life.  He emerges from prison a reformed character, vowing to pay more attention to personal matters and less to business. He apologises to Jill for his neglect and unreasonableness, saying that he has judged Tom unfairly and he is now happy to allow them to marry.

Cast
 Gibb McLaughlin as Sir Grant Rayburn
 Ida Lupino as Jill Rayburn
 John Batten as Tom
 Abraham Sofaer as Myers
 D. A. Clarke-Smith as Dodman
 John H. Roberts as Ladcock

References

Bibliography
 Chibnall, Steve. Quota Quickies: The Birth of the British 'B' Film. British Film Institute, 2007.
 Low, Rachael. Filmmaking in 1930s Britain. George Allen & Unwin, 1985.
 Wood, Linda. British Films, 1927-1939. British Film Institute, 1986.

External links
 
 High Finance at BFI Film & TV Database

1933 films
1933 drama films
Films directed by George King
Lost British films
British black-and-white films
Films about businesspeople
British drama films
1930s English-language films
1930s British films
Warner Bros. films
Quota quickies
Films shot at Teddington Studios